A soulmate is a person with whom one has a feeling of deep or natural affinity. This may involve similarity, love, romance, platonic relationships, comfort, intimacy, sexuality, sexual activity, spirituality, compatibility and trust.

Definition 
In current usage, "soulmate" usually refers to a romantic or platonic partner, with the implication of an exclusive lifelong bond. It commonly holds the connotation of being the strongest bond with another person  that one can achieve.  People who believe in soulmates commonly accept that one will feel 'complete' once they have found their soulmate, as it is partially in the perceived definition that two souls are meant to unite. The term "soulmate" first appeared in the English language in a letter by Samuel Taylor Coleridge in 1822.

Criticism
Some psychologists state that believing that a soulmate exists specifically for a person is an unrealistic expectation.

Historical usage of the concept

Theosophy
According to the esoteric religious movement Theosophy, whose claims were modified by Edgar Cayce, God created androgynous souls—equally male and female. Later theories postulate that the souls split into separate genders, perhaps because they incurred karma while playing around on the Earth, or "separation from God." Over a number of reincarnations, each half seeks the other. When all karmic debt is purged, the two will fuse back together and return to the ultimate.

New Age

According to Mark L. Prophet and Elizabeth Clare Prophet, a soulmate is a separate entity with whom one has spent many lifetimes as a friend, lover, co-worker or partner, and to whom one is usually drawn to fulfill a specific mission.  They describe a soulmate as one of many potential spiritual brothers or sisters: "even though there may be a great attraction and bond between soulmates, fundamentally, in the ultimate sense, you could define it more as a brother/sister relationship, even though soulmates have great marriages and a great union of hearts." According to Mark Prophet: "A soulmate relationship has to do with the seat of the soul Chandra, that Chandra just above the base ... The connection is one of parallel and mutual evolution rather than origin."

See also
 Astrological compatibility
 Bromance
 Interpersonal relationship
 Platonic love
 Romantic friendship
 Red thread of fate
 Romantic love
 Womance

References

Love
Mating
New Age
Philosophy of love